Sofia Cherone (born 21 May 1988) is a team handball player from Uruguay. She plays on the Uruguay women's national handball team, and participated at the 2011 World Women's Handball Championship in Brazil.

Individual awards
 2019 South and Central American Women's Club Handball Championship: Top scorer

References

1988 births
Living people
Uruguayan female handball players
21st-century Uruguayan women